George Russell Sextet at Beethoven Hall (also released as At Beethoven Hall - Complete Recordings) is a 1965 live album by George Russell originally released in two volumes on the MPS label and featuring a performance by Russell with Don Cherry, Bertil Lövgren, Brian Trentham, Ray Pitts, Cameron Brown, and Albert Heath.

Reception
The Allmusic review by Scott Yanow states "This intriguing double LP was innovative composer George Russell's first recording after breaking up his young combo of the early '60s... Most unusual is a suite dedicated to Russell's Lydian concept that includes abstract versions of "Bags' Groove," "Confirmation" and "'Round Midnight".

Track listing
All compositions by George Russell except as indicated
 "Freein' Up" - 12:50
 "Lydia and Her Friends" - 6:59
 "Lydia in Bags Groove" (Milt Jackson) - 5:16
 "Lydia's Confirmation" (Charlie Parker) - 7:17
 "Lydia 'Round Midnight" (Thelonious Monk) - 3:42
 "Takin' Lydia Home" - 2:30
 "You Are My Sunshine" (Jimmie Davis, Charles Mitchell) - 10:56
 "Oh Jazz, Po Jazz" - 5:36
 "Oh Jazz, Po Jazz (continued)" - 5:54
 "Volupte" - 12:12
Recorded at the Beethoven Hall in Stuttgart, Germany, August 31, 1965.

Personnel
George Russell - piano
Don Cherry - cornet
Bertil Lövgren - trumpet
Brian Trentham - trombone
Ray Pitts - tenor saxophone
Cameron Brown - bass
Albert Heath - drums

References

George Russell (composer) live albums
1965 live albums
MPS Records live albums
Albums produced by Joachim-Ernst Berendt